Banca Esperia S.p.A. is an Italian bank which is a joint venture of Mediobanca and Banca Mediolanum (before 2015: Mediolanum S.p.A.).

References

External links
 

Banks of Italy
Companies based in Milan